Nand Kishor Gurjar is an Indian politician. He is Member of the Legislative Assembly from Loni (Assembly constituency) of Ghaziabad, Uttar Pradesh since 2017. In the 2017 election he defeated Bahujan Samaj Party candidate Zakir Ali and Rashtriya Lok Dal candidate Madan Bhaiya.

References 

Living people
21st-century Indian politicians
Year of birth missing (living people)